Arthur Frank Koeninger (November 1, 1906 – December 16, 1990) was an American football center who played three seasons in the National Football League with the Frankford Yellow Jackets, Staten Island Stapletons and Philadelphia Eagles. He played college football at the University of Tennessee at Chattanooga and attended California Area High School in Coal Center, Pennsylvania.

Also an artist living in Homer, Alaska who is the brother of Austin architect Cliff Koeninger.

References

External links
Just Sports Stats

1906 births
1990 deaths
Players of American football from Pennsylvania
American football centers
Chattanooga Mocs football players
Frankford Yellow Jackets players
Staten Island Stapletons players
Philadelphia Eagles players
People from Washington County, Pennsylvania